Gem State Dam is a concrete and rock-fill gravity dam on the Snake River, in the U.S. state of Idaho. Its location is near Idaho Falls, Idaho. The dam's primary purpose is to generate hydroelectricity, but it also provides water for irrigation agriculture.

Gem State Dam is owned and operated by the city of Idaho Falls.

See also

List of dams in the Columbia River watershed

References

Buildings and structures in Bonneville County, Idaho
Dams in Idaho
Hydroelectric power plants in Idaho
United States local public utility dams
Dams completed in 1988
Energy infrastructure completed in 1988
Dams on the Snake River
1988 establishments in Idaho